Kevin J. Keehn is an American air force reserve brigadier general and commercial airline pilot. He is the commander of the New Jersey Air National Guard and a first officer at JetBlue.

References

1950s births
Living people
United States Air Force generals
Commercial aviators